The Ministry of Sports of the Republic of Serbia is the ministry in the Government of Serbia which is in the charge of sports. The current minister is Zoran Gajić, in office since 26 October 2022.

History
The ministry of Youth and Sports was established on 11 February 1991. From 2001 to 2007, the Ministry was merged into the Ministry of Education.

Subordinate institutions
There are several agencies and institutions that operate within the scope of the Ministry:
 Institute of Sport and Sports Medicine
 Antidoping agency

List of ministers
Political Party:

References

External links
 
 Serbian ministries, etc – Rulers.org

Youth And Sports
1991 establishments in Serbia
Ministries established in 1991
Serbia
Serbia